Catherine Morshead is a British TV director. She started her career in 1990 when she directed a show called Science Fiction, and in that same year she directed an episode of the ITV soap opera Emmerdale Farm. In 2008 she directed various episodes of the BBC 1 show Ashes to Ashes. In 2010 she directed two episodes of the fifth series of the revived Doctor Who series; the episodes are titled "Amy's Choice" and "The Lodger".<ref>Steven Cooper Steven Moffat's Doctor Who 2010: the Critical Fan's Guide to Matt ...2011 -p104 "... newcomer Catherine Morshead is mostly straightforward – the nature of the episode doesn't really allow for directorial showing off, although the scenes in the darkened, icy TARDIS were suitably atmospheric, and there's a notable shot at the "</ref> In 2015 she directed the series adaption of Fungus the Bogeyman'', which aired on Christmas 2015.

Director credits

References

External links

Living people
British television directors
Year of birth missing (living people)